In Australia, the Independent Sport Panel Report (Crawford Report) was published in 2009 which summarized the recommendations of an expert panel appointed in 2008 to reform the Australian sports system in preparation for future challenges. The Independent Sport Panel, chaired by David Crawford, published a report which comprised eight recommendations on reform of the structure and programs of the elite sport system and an increased focus on participation and physical activity.

Committee
  David Crawford – retired national chairman of KPMG and director of several major companies, including BHP Billiton, Foster's Group, Lend Lease, National Foods and Westpac Banking Corporation
 Anthony Separovich – creator of Wizard Home Loans and Sydney Rooster Rugby League Club board member
 Sam Mostyn – background in law and corporate affairs, and Australian Football League commissioner
 Pam Tye – Hockey Australia President and former Australian Sports Commission board member
 Colin Carter – senior adviser to the Boston Consulting Group and director of several companies, including Wesfarmers and World Vision

Objectives
Ensure Australia's continued sporting success
Better place sport and physical activity as a key component of the government's preventative-health approach
Strengthen pathways from junior sport to grassroots community sport to elite and professional sport
Maintain Australia's approach to sports science, research and technology
Identify opportunities to increase and diversify the funding base for sport through corporate sponsorship, media and any recommended reforms, such as enhancing the effectiveness of the Australian Sports Foundation

Outcomes
The report's findings covered eight areas:
Defining the national sports vision
Reforming the Australian Sports Commission to lead the sports system
Merging institutes of sport
Building the capacity of national sporting organisations
Putting sport and physical activity back into education
Building community sport with people and places
Ensuring Australia's sports system is open to all
Sustaining the funding base for sport

References

Sport in Australia